REDTV is a web-based channel established by UBA. The channel creates entertainment content spotlighting contemporary African fashion, design, art, music, sport, movies travel and more.

History 
From an online video content channel, REDTV has pivoted into a media company with the formation of an on demand audio platform, RED RADIO - an online lifestyle web radio/podcast hub that brings music, entertainment, information, news, and trends to diverse audiences.

Since its launch, REDTV has aired shows like The Men's Club (Nigerian web series), Africa's Next Top Model, Assistant Madams, Inspector K, Our best friend's wedding, and on December 26, 2021, the channel launched its first feature-length movie, Unintentional (2021 film). 
   
REDTV has over 50,000,000 YouTube views and over 300,000 subscribers at January 2021.

Productions

TV Shows 
The Sauce 
Africa's Next Top Model (season 1)
Interiors by Design
Afropolitan Chef
Here & now
Our Best Friend’s Wedding
Inspector K 
Boutique Hotel
The Setup
The Hangover Show
Red Hot Topics
Assistant Madams
Just Bants
Red TV Christmas
Public Figure 
Red TV Exclusives 
Fit with Zaza
The Men's Club (Nigerian web series)

Films 
Unintentional (2021 film)

Recognition 
The Men's Club (TMC) Gage's Awards’ Web Series of the Year 2020 
‘Best African TV Series’ The Men's Club, Hapa Awards 2021

See also 

 The Men's Club (Nigerian web series)
 Unintentional (2021 film)

References 

YouTube channels
Mass media in Nigeria
Nigerian YouTubers